William Inglis Brown (born 25 November 1938) is a Scottish retired professional footballer, who played as a goalkeeper in the English Football League. He was born in Clydebank.

References

Sources

External links

1938 births
Living people
Sportspeople from Clydebank
Footballers from West Dunbartonshire
Scottish footballers
Accrington Stanley F.C. (1891) players
St Mirren F.C. players
Chester City F.C. players
Greenock Morton F.C. players
English Football League players
Association football goalkeepers
Arthurlie F.C. players
Scottish Football League players
Scottish Junior Football Association players